Dean Clark (born 6 January 1968) is a New Zealand rugby league coach and former footballer who represented New Zealand between 1989 and 1992.

Playing career
An Otahuhu Leopards junior, Clark joined the Eastern Suburbs Roosters in 1988 playing in seven matches.

Clark then travelled to England, joining Hull Kingston Rovers in the English competition.

Clark returned to New Zealand in 1995, playing for the Counties Manukau Heroes in the Lion Red Cup.

Clark played with the Leeds Rhinos in 1996, but was released from the club after one season.

Clark then moved to the Mangere East Hawks, where he played in the 1998 Fox Memorial grand final.

In 1999 Clark joined the Otahuhu Leopards, and represented Auckland South.

Representative career
An Auckland representative, Clark played for the Kiwis seven times between 1989 and 1992. He was a trialist in 1993 but did not make the final Kiwis side.

Clark represented the New Zealand Māori in 1990, 1995 and at the 1997 Oceania Cup.

Clark played for the New Zealand Residents in 1990, 1992 and 1995.

Coaching career
In the 2000 Bartercard Cup Clark was the player-coach of the Otahuhu Leopards, his first coaching role. The Leopards made the grand final, losing 24-38 to the Canterbury Bulls.

Clark coached the Tamaki Titans between 2006 and 2007 in the Bartercard Cup. He was the coach of the New Zealand Māori in 2006.

He coached the Papakura Sea Eagles to seventh in 2010, and again in 2011.

References

1968 births
Living people
Auckland rugby league team players
Counties Manukau rugby league team players
Hull Kingston Rovers players
Junior Kiwis players
Leeds Rhinos players
Mangere East Hawks players
New Zealand Māori rugby league players
New Zealand Māori rugby league team coaches
New Zealand Māori rugby league team players
New Zealand national rugby league team players
New Zealand rugby league coaches
New Zealand rugby league players
Otahuhu Leopards coaches
Otahuhu Leopards players
Papakura Sea Eagles coaches
Rugby league five-eighths
Sydney Roosters players